Buffalo Springs (formerly, Buffalo Mineral Springs and Buffalo Lithia Springs) is an unincorporated community in Mecklenburg County, Virginia. It lies at an elevation of 364 feet (111 m).  Located at Buffalo Springs is the Buffalo Springs Historical Archeological District, listed on the National Register of Historic Places in 1998. The name, Buffalo Springs, specifically refers to a natural spring found in the area.

There was once a resort at the Springs, containing golf courses and even a bowling alley, but when water sales dropped the resort lost favor. The property surrounding the springs was eventually purchased by the US Army Corps of Engineers as part of the John H. Kerr Reservoir.

References

Unincorporated communities in Mecklenburg County, Virginia
Unincorporated communities in Virginia